Iowa Highway 12 (Iowa 12) is a  state highway that runs from north to south in northwestern Iowa.  The highway begins in eastern Sioux City at U.S. Highway 20 (US 20) and US 75.  For the first  of the route, Iowa 12 is an unsigned highway.  The first  are signed only as U.S. Highway 20 Business; the other  are overlapped by Interstate 29 (I-29).  From here, the highway lies just east of the Big Sioux River, which separates Iowa from South Dakota.  The northern end of Iowa 12 is in Hawarden at an intersection with Iowa 10.

Route description

Iowa Highway 12 begins at U.S. 20 and U.S. 75 signed as Business US 20.  It continues west through Sioux City and becomes concurrent with Interstate 29 going west to Riverside Boulevard, where signage begins.  It follows Riverside Boulevard while it passes through the Riverside neighborhood in Sioux City.  It passes past Stone State Park in northwestern Sioux City and continues northwest towards Westfield.  It turns northeast to enter Westfield, then intersects Iowa Highway 3.  Iowa 12 and Iowa 3 overlap and go northeast to Akron, where Iowa 3 turns east.  Iowa 12 continues northeast through Chatsworth and ends at Iowa 10 in Hawarden.

History

Iowa Highway 12 was designated as a state highway in 1920.  It originally went between Hamburg and Akron.  It was shortened to Missouri Valley in 1924, and Sioux City in 1926.  In 1931, it was extended north to Hawarden.  In 1958, it was shortened to its intersection with I-29, but then in 1979, was extended east along I-29 and the newly formed Business Route 20 to end at the new U.S. 20 bypass in eastern Sioux City.  In 2000, signage for this extension was removed and signage for Iowa 12 ended at I-29, though officially, Iowa 12 continues east through Sioux City.

Major intersections

References

012
U.S. Route 20
Transportation in Woodbury County, Iowa
Transportation in Plymouth County, Iowa
Transportation in Sioux County, Iowa
Sioux City, Iowa